The Orchards Mall is an enclosed shopping mall near Benton Harbor, Michigan. Opened in 1979, the mall originally featured Sears and JCPenney as its anchor stores, with Elder-Beerman (later in 2011 known as Carson's) being added in the 1990s. All three anchors have vacated in the 2010s, as has much of the mall's interior. The last two remaining traditional retail stores are Doctor Zzzz'z Mattress Center and Open Box Outlet, as well as the post office. The mall is owned by Durga LLC.

History
Meyer C. Weiner Company first proposed a mall called Pipestone Mall in Benton Harbor in 1974. By March 1976, Hudson's had been rumored as a potential anchor store. Westcor acquired the land in August of the same year. The mall was part of a development along Pipestone Road near Interstate 94 which also comprised a strip mall anchored by a Kmart. By 1977, Sears and J. C. Penney had been confirmed as anchors, with negotiations underway for Carson Pirie Scott as the third anchor.

Orchards Mall was built in 1979 by Westcor. Opening for business in 1979, it featured J. C. Penney and Sears. Major tenants included Walgreens and York Steak House. Elder-Beerman was added in 1992 as the mall's third anchor store. Walgreens moved out of the Orchards in the mid-1990s, with its store space remaining vacant until Jo-Ann Fabrics replaced it in the late-mid 2000s.

General Growth Properties became the mall's management in 1999. A year later, several new stores were added, including Bath & Body Works, while the Casual Corner and Finish Line, Inc. stores were remodeled. Benton Township approved a $111,000 tax cut to help attract new businesses. General Growth sold the Orchards to Sequoia Investments in 2002, at which point four more businesses opened, including a Subway and a Chinese eatery in the food court. KB Toys, an original tenant, closed in 2004. Ponderosa, which closed in 1997, became an Italian eatery in 2007. The same year, the Subway became a local restaurant.

Decline
Sears closed its store at the Orchards in 2009 and remained vacant since. Overflow Church purchased the building in 2012 and intended to move into it.  Elder-Beerman was converted to a Carson's in 2011. Sears returned to the mall in 2012 with its Sears Hometown format, a smaller-scale Sears store which sells major appliances and household hardware, in a spot vacated by an FYE music store. At the same time, the former Sears Auto Center on a mall outparcel was reopened as a local auto repair shop.

In 2014 the Orchards was put up for sale; Kohan Retail Investment Group purchased it on December 9.

Sears Hometown closed in July 2017. On January 31, 2018, The Bon-Ton announced that Carson's would be part of a plan to close 42 stores nationwide. The store was closed in April 2018. In June 2018, the water supply to the Orchards was cut off. The owner, Kohan Retail Investment Group had outstanding water bills. The mall was closed for a day because the occupancy to the mall had been revoked, although JCPenney remained open. The Orchards reopened the following day. It was sold to Durga LLC, on November 30, 2018 and management was taken over by Bedi & Associates LLC in June 2020. 

On March 4, 2019, it was announced that JCPenney would also be closing as part of its planned closure of 27 stores nationwide. The JCPenney closed on July 5, 2019. In this same period, Rainbow Shops, one of the last three national tenants in the Orchards closed too. In August of 2020, Bath & Body Works moved out of the mall. They never reopened in the mall space since COVID-19, and instead relocated to The Fairplain Plaza. In November 2021, Jo-Ann Fabrics announced it would be closing and relocating to the space next to the nearby Ollie's Bargain Outlet that once held Ridge & Kramer Auto Parts and Big Lots. The store opened in late July 2022.

, three businesses remaining at the mall, two of which are the last remaining stores, are a mattress store, Doctor ZZZZ'Z; a discount furniture store, Open Box Outlet, which occupies the former Jo-Ann Fabrics space; and a US Postal Service branch. Many storefronts in the mall have been vacant for 10+ years as of December 2022. 

In late December 2022, a burst water main caused significant damage in the mall. The mall reopened a week later. 

As tenants have vacated the mall, gulls have become a nuisance. In spite of this and other deterioration,  there are no plans to demolish the building.

References

External links
The Orchards Mall

Shopping malls in Michigan
Shopping malls established in 1979
Buildings and structures in Berrien County, Michigan
Tourist attractions in Berrien County, Michigan
1979 establishments in Michigan